The Auckland women's field hockey team are an amateur sports team based in Auckland, New Zealand. The team competes annually in the Ford National Hockey League (NHL).

Auckland are the most successful team in the Women's NHL, having won the championship a total of 5 times.

Team Roster
The following is the Auckland team roster for the 2017 Ford NHL:

Head coach: Jude Menezes

Amelia Gibson (GK)
Samantha Harrison
Danielle Jones
Katie Doar
Belinda Smith
Madison Doar
Maddison Dowe
Polly Inglis
Phoebe Steele
Beckie Middleton
Julia King (C)
Deanna Ritchie
Ali Hunt
Lulu Tuilotolava
Amelia Marlow
Victoria Methven
Sophia Howard (GK)
Tayla White

References

Women's field hockey teams in New Zealand
2000 establishments in New Zealand